Naples in Veils is a 2017 mystery, thriller and noir film directed by Turkish-Italian filmmaker Ferzan Özpetek. The plot is centered around Adriana, a Naples-based medical examiner in her forties who falls for a younger man and spends the night with him at her place.

Plot
During a Neapolitan ceremony involving femminielli at her aunt's house, medical examiner Adriana (Giovanna Mezzogiorno) is seduced by a handsome young man, Andrea (Alessandro Borghi). The two spend a sex-filled night at her place. Andrea asks Adriana to meet again later that afternoon, but he disappoints her by not showing up for the date. The following day, Adriana discovers that the young man on whom she is carrying out a post-mortem examination is Andrea. Someone murdered him and gouged out his eyes. Additionally, Adriana finds out from police inspectors that Andrea had taken pictures of her naked after they had sex. Soon after, she decides to investigate the circumstances surrounding Andrea's mysterious and brutal death. A man who looks exactly like Andrea, however, seems to repeatedly appear around town whenever Adriana is present.

Cast
 Giovanna Mezzogiorno as Adriana / Isabella
 Alessandro Borghi as Andrea Galderisi / Luca
 Anna Bonaiuto as Adele
  as Pasquale
 Luisa Ranieri as Catena
 Maria Pia Calzone as Rosaria
 Lina Sastri as Ludovica
 Isabella Ferrari as Valeria
 Loredana Cannata as Liliana

Production

Release
The film was released in Italy on 28 December 2017. Its release for Blu-ray and DVD sales took place on 23 April 2019.

Reception

Box office
Naples in Veils grossed $0 in the United States and Canada and $7.2 million in other territories, plus $609 with home video sales.

Critical response
On review aggregator Rotten Tomatoes, the film holds an approval rating of 86% based on 7 reviews, with an average rating of 6.69/10.

See also
Oedipus Rex (Sophocles play)

References

External links

2017 films
Films directed by Ferzan Özpetek
Films shot in Naples
Films set in Naples
Italian nonlinear narrative films
2010s mystery thriller films
Italian mystery thriller films